The canton of Chatou is an administrative division of the Yvelines department, northern France. Its borders were modified at the French canton reorganisation which came into effect in March 2015. Its seat is in Chatou.

It consists of the following communes:
Chatou
Croissy-sur-Seine
Marly-le-Roi
Le Port-Marly
Le Vésinet

References

Cantons of Yvelines